The Chapel of St. Mary the Virgin is an Gothic Revival-styled church completed in 1866 near Nashotah, Wisconsin - part of the Episcopal Nashotah House seminary. The chapel's design has been attributed to James Douglas and Richard Upjohn. On February 23, 1972, it was added to the National Register of Historic Places for its significance in architecture and religion.

References

Gothic Revival church buildings in Wisconsin
Churches completed in 1866
Churches in Waukesha County, Wisconsin
Churches on the National Register of Historic Places in Wisconsin
Chapels in the United States
Richard Upjohn church buildings
1866 establishments in Wisconsin
National Register of Historic Places in Waukesha County, Wisconsin